Lloyd Icefall is a large icefall at the head of Lillie Glacier, draining from the Antarctic polar plateau between the King Range and the Millen Range. It was named by the Northern Party of the New Zealand Federated Mountain Clubs Antarctic Expedition (NZFMCAE), 1962–63, for R. Lloyd, a field assistant with the Southern Party of that expedition.

References

Icefalls of Antarctica
Landforms of Victoria Land
Pennell Coast